Intex Resources is an international mining company based in Norway. Its portfolio consists of non-precious minerals and the main project is a nickel project in Mindoro in the Philippines. Other projects include Hurdal and Ramnes, both molybdenum north of Oslo in Norway, Seqi Olivine in Sweden and Maniitsoq diamond project north of Nuuk in Greenland.

The longtime Chairman of Intex Resources stepped down Sep 19, 2013.

The company was created as a demerger from Crew Gold and the largest owner is the Canadian Crew Development Corp. (28%). The main office is located in Oslo.

References 

Mining companies of Norway
Companies based in Oslo
Companies listed on the Oslo Stock Exchange
Companies established in 1996
1996 establishments in Norway